Tarcoola is a town in South Australia.

Tarcoola may also refer to:

 Mount Tarcoola, Western Australia
 Tarcoola Beach, Western Australia
 Tarcoola (horse), a Melbourne Cup winner